Martha Mansfield (born Martha Ehrlich; July 14, 1899 – November 30, 1923) was an American actress in silent films and vaudeville stage plays.

Early life
She was born in New York City to Maurice and Harriett Gibson Ehrlich. She had a younger sister, Edith, born in 1905. Although many biographies state that Martha was born in Mansfield, Ohio, her birth record and death certificate both have New York City as her place of birth. Her mother, Harriet, was from Mansfield, Ohio, having emigrated there from Ireland in 1885. Martha later adopted the name of the town as her stage name. By the early 1910s, Mansfield and her mother had moved to the Bronx and were living on 158th Street.

Career
At the age of 14, she became determined to become an actress. She lobbied for, and won, a role in the Broadway production of Little Women in 1912. She also began working as an artists' model and dancer. She danced in the musical Hop o' My Thumb in 1913, still using her birth name. She also acted in The Passing Show of 1915 and Robinson Crusoe, Jr. before changing her name. As a model, she posed for illustrator Harrison Fisher and was the subject of more than 300 photographs by Alfred Cheney Johnston.

Using the name Martha Early, she was signed to a six-month contract with Essanay Studios in 1917 where she appeared in three films with French actor Max Linder. In 1918, she appeared in the Ziegfeld Follies. Later that same year, she made her feature film debut in Broadway Bill, opposite Harold Lockwood. In early 1919, Mansfield announced that she had decided to pursue a film career full-time. Before she relocated to the west coast, Mansfield played leads in films produced by Famous Players-Lasky. In October 1919, she appeared in Florenz Ziegfeld's The Midnight Frolic.

Her first Hollywood movie was Civilian Clothes (1920) directed by Hugh Ford. She gained prominence as Millicent Carew (originally offered to Tallulah Bankhead) in the film adaptation of Dr. Jekyll and Mr. Hyde, which starred John Barrymore. She then signed with Selznick Pictures where she was cast with Eugene O'Brien in The Perfect Lover (1919). In 1921, Mansfield returned to the stage in a vaudeville tour. She appeared in two independent films the following year: Queen of the Moulin Rouge and Till We Meet Again. She spent the remainder of the year touring the vaudeville circuit.

In 1923, Mansfield completed her contract for Selznick and signed with Fox Film Corporation. Her first film for Fox was The Silent Command, starring Edmund Lowe and Béla Lugosi. The final completed features in her short film career were Potash and Perlmutter and The Leavenworth Case, both from 1923.

Death 

On November 29, 1923, while working on location in San Antonio, Texas on the film The Warrens of Virginia, Mansfield was severely burned when a tossed match ignited her Civil War costume of hoop skirts and flimsy ruffles. Mansfield was playing the role of Agatha Warren and had just finished her scenes and retired to a car when her clothing burst into flames. Her neck and face were saved when leading man Wilfred Lytell threw his heavy overcoat over her. The chauffeur of Mansfield's car was burned badly on his hands while trying to remove the burning clothing from the actress. The fire was put out, but she sustained substantial burns to her body.

She was rushed to a hospital where she died the following day of "burns of all extremities, general toxemia and suppression of urine". Mansfield was 24 years old. Accompanied by actor Phillip Shorey, Mansfield's body was transported back to her home in New York City. She was interred at the Woodlawn Cemetery in The Bronx. It was never determined who threw the match that ignited Mansfield's clothing. Some witnesses said they saw a match enter through the window of the car Mansfield was sitting in. Another theory was that a nervous Mansfield decided to smoke a cigarette in the car to calm her nerves and accidentally ignited the dress with a dropped match or a cigarette. Mansfield's mother, Harriett Ehrlich, dismissed this theory as she said smoking made her daughter "uncomfortable".

Aftermath
When the Warrens of Virginia was finally released in late 1924, Mansfield's role had been edited down, and Rosemary Hill was promoted as the female lead.

Mansfield left an estate valued at $2,473. She bequeathed $22,000 in Liberty bonds to her mother. She also left her mother two life insurance policies worth $25,000 each.

Filmography

References

External links

1920 passport photo of Martha Mansfield at flickr

1899 births
1923 deaths
20th-century American actresses
Accidental deaths in Texas
Actresses from New York City
American child actresses
American female dancers
American artists' models
American female models
American musical theatre actresses
American silent film actresses
American stage actresses
Burials at Woodlawn Cemetery (Bronx, New York)
Deaths from fire in the United States
Vaudeville performers
Ziegfeld girls
Dancers from New York (state)
20th-century American women singers
20th-century American singers
20th-century American dancers